The Puerto Blanco Formation is a geologic formation in Mexico. It preserves fossils dating back to the Cambrian period.

See also

 List of fossiliferous stratigraphic units in Mexico

References

Cambrian Mexico
Cambrian southern paleotropical deposits